Ninja Louise Jorgensen (July 6, 1940 – October 3, 2017) was an American volleyball player. She played for the United States national team at the 1967 Pan American Games and the 1968 Summer Olympics.

Life 
She was born in Los Angeles, California.
From 1962 to 1998, she was coach at Glendale High School.

References

1940 births
2017 deaths
Olympic volleyball players of the United States
Volleyball players at the 1968 Summer Olympics
Volleyball players at the 1967 Pan American Games
Pan American Games gold medalists for the United States
Volleyball players from Los Angeles
American women's volleyball players
Pan American Games medalists in volleyball
Medalists at the 1967 Pan American Games
21st-century American women